Masal (also romanized as Māsāl; also known as Bāzār-e Māsāl, Masal-Bazar, Sar-i-Bāzar, and Sārī Bāzār Mūsār) is a city and capital of Masal County, Gilan Province, Iran. At the 2006 census, its population was 10,992, in 2,986 families.
The population consists of Talysh people.
The language of Masal is Talysh

Language 
Linguistic composition of the city.

References

 Encyclopaedia Iranica: Māsāl
 

Populated places in Masal County

Cities in Gilan Province

Talysh settlements in Gilan Province

Gilak settlements in Gilan Province